The 1900–01 season was English football club West Ham United’s inaugural season. The club had been founded in 1895 under the name of Thames Ironworks, before being wound up in June 1900 and resigning from the Southern League. On 5 July, West Ham United Football Club Company Limited was registered and the club took the Southern League place vacated by Thames Ironworks. They finished the season sixth in the Southern League Division One. The club also entered the FA Cup, reaching the intermediate round.

Overview

Shares in the club were sold to the public at 10 shillings each, with Arnold Hills promising to purchase one share for each one sold to the public. These could be purchased in four instalments of 2/6 d. Of the 4,000 shares available, 260 remained unsold in March 1901. At the first meeting of directors on 10 July 1900, Cornelius Osborn was appointed as chairman, with Lew Bowen as club secretary. Bowen was a clerk at the Thames Ironworks and Shipbuilding Company and had reported on the previous club for the Thames Ironworks Gazette. Of the ten directors, half were appointed by Hills and half by the shareholders, including Aitken Brown, a local councillor. Also amongst the directors was former Old St Luke's player and local businessman George Fundell. All of the directors lived in Essex, most in the Canning Town and West Ham areas, and several had connections to the Ironworks or had business relationships with Hills. In spite of Hills' assistance the club struggled financially and were forced to secure a loan of £400 later in the season.

The club continued to play at the Memorial Grounds, with hopes that the new train station at West Ham would enable greater access to the stadium. Ultimately, the station would not be opened until February 1901. Hills’ promise to match the public shareholding, and his offer of free use of the Memorial Grounds, came with the proviso that the players would refrain from drinking alcohol. As such, the club continued to be known as the Teetotallers, in addition to the Irons and the Hammers, references to the club's shipbuilding heritage. Fines were imposed on players that did not adhere to the principle of abstinence. They would play in the Southern League First Division for the second season, after being promoted as Thames Ironworks prior to 1899–1900. A preview of the season in the Daily News described the league as "now, without a doubt, second only in importance and the strength of its clubs to the Football League itself. With the exception of Woolwich Arsenal, who prefer to remain members of the Second Division of the Football League, all the best professional teams in the South are now enrolled in the ranks of the Southern League".

Many of the playing staff continued with the new club. The likes of Bill Joyce, Kenny McKay and Albert Carnelly had departed, but Tommy Moore, Syd King, Charlie Craig, Charlie Dove, George Neil, Bob Allan, Roddy McEachrane, Fred Corbett, Frankie Taylor and Len Walker all played a part in the season. Players signed from other clubs before the start of the season included Hugh Monteith from Bristol City, Billy Grassam and Jimmy Reid from Burslem Port Vale, Luke Raisbeck from Middlesbrough, Fergus Hunt from Woolwich Arsenal, Fred Fenton from Gainsborough Trinity, and Albert Kaye from Chatham. Walter Tranter, who had played for the Ironworks before spending the previous season at Chatham, was also signed. Tom Robinson, the previous trainer, also remained, and Abe Norris was appointed. Of the former Ironworks players, only Tranter, Craig, Dove, and captain McEachrane, featured in the opening fixture against Gravesend United.

West Ham's first match, on 1 September 1900, saw the club run out 7–0 winners against the Kent club, although the attendance was unexpectedly low at 2,000. Billy Grassam scored four of the goals, the first within five minutes, with Reid scoring a brace and Hunt the other. The match saw the introduction of new team colours, with a claret stripe running down the white shorts and black socks replacing the previous claret ones, although light blue shirts were still worn. The kit would be commemorated 117 years later as the basis for the club's third kit for the 2017–18 season. 

After a 3–1 away defeat to rival club Millwall Athletic, the club hosted Southampton, who had won the Southern League title in three of the previous four seasons and had reached the FA Cup Final in 1899–1900. 7,500 attended the match and witnessed the Irons win 2–0. There was some controversy, however, as the match had to be stopped for around 20 minutes after a pitch invasion and the club directorate came in for criticism due to the presence of only two police constables.

Former Thames Ironworks club secretary George Neil would play his only game for the new club on 13 October, replacing the injured Bob Allan against Watford. West Ham won 2–0, with goals from Corbett and Fenton, which saw the club placed third in the table after six games. On 3 November, West Ham played their first FA Cup game, a third qualifying round fixture against local amateur club Olympic at the Memorial Grounds. The match was a one-sided affair, with the away team goalkeeper Meates performing well to keep the scoreline at 1–0, after Fenton had scored 10 minutes in with a ball that had appeared to be meant as a cross. After an injury to Charlie Dove, the club signed Willie Kelly from Hamilton Academical. His debut came against Bristol Rovers on 24 November. The Hammers also signed George Ratcliffe from Grimsby Town, then of the Football League Second Division. He scored on his debut against Reading on 1 December.

The largest home attendance came in an FA Cup fifth qualifying round fixture against local side Clapton on 8 December. A crowd of 10,000 attended the match, which ended 1–1. The Hammers went on to win the replay at the Old Spotted Dog Ground 3–2 after Billy Grassam scored a hat-trick. The Clapton ‘keeper Harry Earle (whose son later played for West Ham) had been at fault for the second after running out and leaving his goal unguarded. West Ham progressed to the intermediate round of the competition, featuring teams that had overcome the qualifying rounds and those that had been given byes. On 5 January 1901, 6,000 attended the match at home to Liverpool – the first League opposition to play at the Memorial Grounds – which saw Sam Raybould’s goal, contested as offside by the home team, give the visitors a 1–0 victory and progression in the competition.  Then followed a loss to Bristol City and three victories, over Swindon Town, Watford and Luton Town, before the club’s worst defeat of the season on 16 February. This came at the hands of Tottenham Hotspur, a 4–1 loss in which Tommy Moore, deputising in goal for Hugh Monteith who had lumbago, was at fault for three of the goals. This would prove to be his final appearance for the club and he left at the end of the season after three years of service.

The club then embarked on an eight-match unbeaten run, which included victory over Millwall, and would take them through to the season’s penultimate fixture, away to Reading. Grassam scored the last of his 12 league goals in the match, but three goals from the Royals in the second half ended the run. On 28 April, West Ham finished their first season with a 2–0 win over New Brompton. The match marked the final appearance of Charlie Dove – the only player to have remained at the club since its inception as Thames Ironworks six years previously – who left for Millwall. With that win, the Hammers ensured a sixth-place finish.

Personnel

Directors

Squad

a. Indicates the most common position played during this season

Friendlies
West Ham played a number of friendlies over the course of the season, including a Christmas Day fixture against Woolwich Arsenal, local derbies against Millwall Athletic and Leytonstone, and a benefit match for Portsmouth goalkeeper Matt Reilly.

Competitions

Overview

Southern League

League table

Matches

FA Cup

Matches

References

Bibliography

External links
Southern League 1st Division 1900-01 at westhamstats.info
The History of West Ham United: 1900-1901 at Spartacus Educational

West Ham United
West Ham United F.C. seasons
West Ham United
West Ham United